The friendly bush warbler (Locustella accentor), also known as the Kinabalu friendly warbler, is a species of Old World warbler in the family Locustellidae. It is endemic to the island of Borneo.

References

friendly bush warbler
Birds of East Malaysia
Endemic birds of Borneo
friendly bush warbler
Taxa named by Richard Bowdler Sharpe
Taxonomy articles created by Polbot
Fauna of the Borneo montane rain forests